Arturo Oporta (born 26 September 1964) is a Panamanian wrestler. He competed in the men's freestyle 62 kg at the 1988 Summer Olympics.

References

External links
 

1964 births
Living people
Panamanian male sport wrestlers
Olympic wrestlers of Panama
Wrestlers at the 1988 Summer Olympics
Place of birth missing (living people)
20th-century Panamanian people
21st-century Panamanian people